In Greek mythology, Bathycles was a Thessalian Myrmidon warrior, who took part in the Trojan War on the side of the Achaeans.

Family 
His father was called Chalcon (Χάλκων).

Mythology 
Bathycles was killed in the Trojan War by Glaucus and is mentioned in Homer's Iliad (rhapsody 16):

Note

References 
 Homer, The Iliad with an English Translation by A.T. Murray, Ph.D. in two volumes. Cambridge, MA., Harvard University Press; London, William Heinemann, Ltd. 1924. . Online version at the Perseus Digital Library.
 Homer, Homeri Opera in five volumes. Oxford, Oxford University Press. 1920. . Greek text available at the Perseus Digital Library.

Ancient Thessalians
Achaeans (Homer)